Vargo may refer to:

Alexander Vargo, Russian writer
Bruce Vargo, United States Army personnel
Mark Vargo (born 1954), American special effects artist
Stephen Vargo, American academic
Trina Vargo, American politician scientist
 Vargö, an island in Sweden (Vargo is an anglicized alternate spelling without diacritics)
 Vargo (band), a German electronic music duo